Feinberg, Feinberger is surname of:

 Aaron Feinberg, American rollerblading champion
 Abraham Feinberg (1899–1986), American rabbi and singer. 
 Andrew Feinberg (geneticist)
 Andrew Feinberg (journalist)
 Avshalom Feinberg (1889–1917), a leader of Nili
 Baruch Feinberg (born 1933), Israeli Olympic javelin thrower
 Benjamin F. Feinberg (1888–1959), New York politician
 Charles L. Feinberg (1909–1995), American biblical scholar, first dean of Talbot Theological Seminary
 Israel Lewis Feinberg (1872–1941), New York City coroner
 Gerald Feinberg (1933–1992), American physicist
 Jay Feinberg, American community activist and founder of Gift of Life Marrow Registry
 Joel Feinberg (1926–2004), American philosopher
 John Feinberg, American theologian
 Kenneth Feinberg, American attorney, Special Master of the September 11th Victim Compensation Fund
 Leon Feinberg, (1897–1969) Russian-American Yiddish poet and journalist
 Leslie Feinberg, transgender activist
 Louis Feinberg (1902–1975), birth name of Larry Fine, one of The Three Stooges
 Martin Feinberg, chemist
 Mildred Feinberg (1899–1990), American artist
 Paul Feinberg (1938–2004), American theologian
 Samuel Feinberg (1902–1989), birth name of Sammy Fain, American popular music composer
 Samuil Feinberg, Russian composer and pianist
 Sarah Feinberg (born 1977), American Interim President of the New York City Transit Authority, and former Administrator of the Federal Railroad Administration
 Savely Moiseevich Feinberg (1910–1973), Soviet nuclear physicist, chief engineer of the VVER reactor design.
 Steve Feinberg, founder of Cerberus Capital Management, LP

See also 
 15569 Feinberg (asteroid)
 Feinberg School of Medicine at Northwestern University

Jewish surnames
German-language surnames
Yiddish-language surnames